Kanailal Vidyamandir [English Section] one of the oldest school (Established:1862)  in Hooghly district in the state of West Bengal. It is situated in Chandannagar town beside the Grand Trunk Road (G.T Road).

History 
Kanailal Vidyamandir was established as the "Saint Mary's Institution" by "Father Maglayer Barthet" in 1862. At first it used to teach only French language as Chandannagar was a French colony. English education started in 1872 by the then Puducherry French government.

In 1887 the institution was taken over by the French government. In 1901 "Saint Mary's Institution" was renamed as "Dupleix College". In 1908 the college department of "Dupleix College" was abolished which was later restored in 1931 by the efforts of Charu Chandra Ray, Harihar Seth and Narayan Chandra Dey. The school was renamed Kanailal Vidyamandir after the Bengali revolutionary Shahid Kanailal Dutta, a student of this school, on 17 May 1948 just before the liberation from the French rule. The Centenary ceremony of the school was inaugurated by Dr. Brajakanta Guha, the Vice-Chancellor of University of Burdwan on its first day. The school celebrated its 150th anniversary in 2012. This school has produced numerous scholars who later became big names in their respective fields.

Colonial architecture is visible on the building made of brick and lime with wooden roof. It was declared as heritage in 2017 by the West Bengal Heritage Commission.

Sections 
The school is divided into two sections. 

1. English Section

2. French Section

These Sections run from separate buildings situated just opposite sides of the Barabazar Main Road.

English Section is from Primary to Higher Secondary and French Section is from Primary to Class 8. After Class 8 students from French Section gets transferred into the English Section. Kanailal Vidya Mandir is one of the oldest and finest Govt. Sponsored Bengali Medium School in this area.

Notable alumni
 Kanailal Dutta After whom the school is named Kanailal Vidya Mandir.

See also
Education in India
List of schools in India
Education in West Bengal

References

External links
info hooghly schools
Wikimapia

Schools in Colonial India
Schools in Hooghly district
Chandannagar
1862 establishments in India